Shane Collins may refer to:
 Shane Collins (American football) (born 1969), former defensive end in the National Football League
 Shane Collins (field hockey) (born 1963), former field hockey player from New Zealand